Jim Chambers (March 16, 1927 – December 31, 1997) was an award winning halfback who played in the Western Interprovincial Football Union.

A native of Montreal, and a graduate of the Westmount Warriors junior program, Chambers won the Dr. Beattie Martin Trophy for Canadian rookie of the year in the west by rushing for 513 yards and an amazing 9.9 yard average for the Edmonton Eskimos in 1951 (coupled with team mate and all-star Normie Kwong).

He played 3 seasons for the Eskimos, rushing for 921 yards and catching 38 passes, but when all-star Rollie Miles joined the team he saw little playing time. He finished his career with the 1954 inaugural BC Lions team, playing 5 games, rushing for 27 yards and catching 4 passes. He died on December 31, 1997, in Toronto, Ontario.

References

External links

1927 births
1997 deaths
Anglophone Quebec people
BC Lions players
Canadian Football League Rookie of the Year Award winners
Edmonton Elks players
Players of Canadian football from Quebec
Canadian football people from Montreal
Canadian football running backs